Baron Gorges was a title created in the Peerage of England in 1309 for the soldier Sir Ralph de Gorges (died 1323) of Wraxall in Somerset, who was summoned to Parliament from 4 March 1309 by writs directed Radulpho de Gorges, whereby he is held to have become Baron Gorges. Following the death of his son the childless 2nd Baron in 1344, the title  became abeyant between the descendants of the latter's two younger sisters Eleanor Russell and Joan Cheyney.

Barons Gorges (1309)
Ralph de Gorges, 1st Baron Gorges (died 1323), who in 1301 married a certain Eleanor, according to Gorges (1944) "rather a formidable dame" and probably the daughter and heiress of Sir John Ferre, of Gascon ancestry, who held lands in Lincolnshire and bore as canting arms a fer-de-moline similar in appearance to a cross moline, a motif which appears on Eleanor's seal surrounding a shield of Gorges modern. Following Gorges's death she remarried to Sir John Peche.
Ralph de Gorges, 2nd Baron Gorges (1308-1344), only son and heir. In 1330 he married a certain Elizabeth but died without issue, leaving his three sisters as his co-heiresses, namely:
Elizabeth de Gorges, wife of Sir Robert Assheton I of Pitney, Somerset, and mother of Sir Robert Assheton II (d.1384), Justiciar of Ireland, Treasurer of the Exchequer, Chancellor, etc. She inherited the Gorges manors of Bradpool and Litton in Dorset, but died without surviving issue;
Eleanor de Gorges, wife of Sir Theobald Russell of Kingston Russell in Dorset. She inherited the Gorges manors of Wraxall and Knighton in the Isle of Wight. Her eldest son and heir Ralph Russell was the father of Sir Maurice Russell (1356-1416) of Kingston Russell and of Dyrham in Gloucestershire, twice a Member of Parliament for Gloucestershire and four times Sheriff of Gloucestershire. To her younger son Theobald de Gorges, she gave her paternal manor of Wraxall, on condition that he should adopt the surname and arms of Gorges in lieu of his patronymic. He is the ancestor of Sir Thomas Gorges (1536-1610) of Longford Castle in Wiltshire, Groom of the Chamber to Queen Elizabeth I and father of Edward Gorges, 1st Baron Gorges of Dundalk (1582/3-1652); also the ancestor of Sir Ferdinando Gorges (c. 1565/88-1647) a naval and military commander, the second son of Edward Gorges of Wraxall, by his wife Cicely Lygon. 
Joan de Gorges, who inherited the Gorges manor of Tothill in Lincolnshire, and married (as his second wife) Sir William Cheyney (d.1345), by whom she had a son Ralph Cheyney (born 1338).

See also
Gorges family
Baron Gorges of Dundalk

Sources
Gorges, Raymond & Brown, Frederick, Rev., FSA. The Story of a Family through Eleven Centuries, Illustrated by Portraits and Pedigrees: Being a History of the Family of Gorges, Boston, USA, (Merrymount Press privately published), 1944. (RG also editor of The letters of Thomas Gorges, Deputy Governor of the Province of Maine, 1640-1643 and author of Ernest Harold Baynes: Naturalist and Crusader,  Boston, 1928)
Cokayne, G. E., H. A. Doubleday, Duncan Warrand, Lord Howard de Walden, eds., The Complete Peerage, or a history of the House of Lords and all its members from the earliest times (Gordon to Hustpierpoint), Vol.6, 2nd ed., London, 1926, pp.9-15, Baron Gorges

References

1309 establishments in England
Baronies by writ
Noble titles created in 1309